Farnham Airport  is located in Farnham, Quebec, Canada.

The aerodrome has one gravel runway used by Parachute Montreal (Parachutisme Nouvel Air). They operate a DHC-6 Twin Otter during the summer months only, leased out from Win Win Aviation.

References

Registered aerodromes in Montérégie
Brome-Missisquoi Regional County Municipality